Lee Chiaw Meng (28 February 1937 – 23 May 2001) was a Singaporean politician who served as Minister of Education between 1972 and 1975, and Minister of Science and Technology between 1975 and 1976. A member of the governing People's Action Party (PAP), he was the Member of Parliament (MP) for Farrer Park SMC between 1968 and 1976, and Tanah Merah SMC between 1980 and 1984.

Early life and education
Lee was educated at Catholic High School and Chung Cheng High School before graduating from the University of Malaya in 1960 with a Bachelor of Engineering degree.

After graduation, Lee worked in the Public Works Department as an engineer until 1961.

He subsequently went on complete a PhD in engineering at the University of London in 1965. Upon returning to Singapore, Lee joined Singapore Polytechnic as a lecturer in civil engineering.

Political career
Lee made his political debut in the 1968 general election as a PAP candidate contesting in Farrer Park SMC and won 84.91% of the vote. 

Lee contested in Farrer Park SMC again during the 1972 general election and won 73.8% of the vote. During the 1976 general election, Lee contested in Farrer Park SMC and won by an uncontested walkover. In the 1980 general election, when Farrer Park SMC was abolished, Lee contested Tanah Merah SMC and won by an uncontested walkover.

In 1972, Lee was appointed Minister of Education and was tasked to overhaul the school and university system. In 1975, in a bid to clear political and cultural obstacles, Prime Minister Lee Kuan Yew appointed Lee as Vice-Chancellor of Nanyang University, taking over from Hsueh Shou Sheng. Lee only served as Vice-Chancellor from March 1975 to August 1976 after failing to convert the Chinese-medium Nanyang University into an English-language university, as required by Lee. From 1975 to 1976, Lee brieflt served as Minister for Science and Technology.

In 1984, Lee left politics and started his own engineering firm, Dr. Lee Chiaw Meng & Associates.

Personal life
Lee was married to Lyn Lee and they had three sons and two daughters. 

He was diagnosed with duodenum cancer in 1999 and died from it on 23 May 2001 at the age of 64.

References

1937 births
2001 deaths
Members of the Cabinet of Singapore
Members of the Parliament of Singapore
People's Action Party politicians
Ministers for Education of Singapore